Vicky Glover is a boxer from Hamilton, near Glasgow, in Scotland.

Early life 
Glover had a difficult childhood. At the age of ten, her father enrolled her into a boxing to help her overcome her difficulties through the discipline and routine that boxing provided. She was involved with community services from a young age; such as Social Workers and Children’s Hearing Systems to encourage her to become engaged with her schooling and prevent any further negative behaviours that Glover describes as “hassel.” She was given a 200 hour community payback order for her involvement in an attack on two men and a car.

Career 
Glover was the first woman to be selected to represent Scotland at the Commonwealth Games, 2018, in the 54 kg category.  In April 2017, she won the Scottish and British Adult Women’s Amateur Championship, again for the 54 kg category. Representing Scotland in the Commonwealth Games in 2018, she was defeated in a split decision by Valerian Spicer of the Dominican Republic.

Glover represented Scotland at the 2018 Women’s World Championship, alongside Stephanie Kernachan and Megan Reid.

Glover made further Scottish boxing history in 2019, as she won the bronze medal in the under-22 European Championships in Russia.  She won the quarter-finals match against Amanda Millere, from Latvia.  Glover lost the semi-final match against her English counterpart, Ellie Scotney, on points. Boxing Scotland stated that this was a ‘tremendous achievement for Glover who is only 19 years of age and was the youngest qualifier’.

In the Annual Report of Boxing Scotland, Glover is congratulated for her contribution to their ‘best ever medal return at a major Elite tournament. Glover also participated in the Women’s World Championships, she accomplished victories early in the tournament but did not progress onto the quarter-final stages.  She can be found on her social media pages on Instagram vicky_glover99 and Twitter @VickyGlover99.

References 

Scottish women boxers
1999 births
Living people